The 1946 Kentucky Derby was the 72nd running of the Kentucky Derby. The race took place on May 4, 1946 on a track rated slow.

Full results

 Winning breeder: King Ranch (TX)

References

1946
Kentucky Derby
Derby
Kentucky Derby